Stella Christodoulou (born July 19, 1991 in Athens, Greece) is a female professional volleyball player from Greece, who is a member of the Greece women's national volleyball team. At club level, she plays in Hellenic Volley League for Greek powerhouse Olympiacos Piraeus

Career 
Stella Christodoulou started her career from Enosi Virona. In 2007 she was transferred at Panellinios G.S. Athens. In 2010 she signed for Panathinaikos Athens, but Panellinios blocked her transfer at Sports Court. Christodoulou was inactive during 2010–11 season. In 2011 she was transferred to Olympiacos Piraeus. Since her arrival at the red-whites of Piraeus, Christodoulou has won 7 Hellenic Championships, 8 Hellenic Cups, the silver medal of the 2016–17 CEV Women's Challenge Cup but mainly the golden medal of the same competition in 2017-18 season.

In atomic level she has been named two times Hellenic Championship MVP, in 2016-17 and 2018-19  seasons and two more times Hellenic Cup MVP in 2014 and 2019 editions. However her most important individual award was the  European Challenge Cup MVP, in the 2018 edition of the competition.

Stella Christooulou, who is considered to be one of the ever best setters in the Hellenic women's volleyball, renewed her contract with the Piraeus team in June 2020, for two more years. In December 2020 the Hellenic championship was uncertain whether it would continue due to covid-19 disease and Olympiacos allowed their players (despite their contracts) to move abroad until next summer. Thus Stella Christooulou moved to Turkish "Sultanlar Ligi" for Aydın Büyükşehir Belediyespor, where she met her compatriot Anthi Vassilantonaki.

International career 
Stella Christodoulou is a member of the Hellenic National Team. She began her international career in 2007 with the Junior (U19) team, competing in the preliminary round of 2008 Junior Women's European Championship. One year later she was promoted to the Women's squad, participating in the preliminary rounds of the 2009 Women's European Volleyball Championship. Since then she has many caps with the National team, of which she is the captain, since May 2017. In 2018 Mediterranean Games she won the silver medal as the captain of the Hellenic National Team. In 2019 she was the captain of the Hellenic National Team in the final phase of the European Championship, participating in all 6 games of Greece.

Personal
Stella is the daughter of Christos Christodoulou, and niece of Fanis Christodoulou. Her sister Elena is also a volleyball player.

Sporting achievements

National Team
 2018  Mediterranean Games

Clubs

International competitions
 2017   CEV Women's Challenge Cup, with Olympiacos Piraeus
 2018   CEV Women's Challenge Cup, with Olympiacos Piraeus

National championships
 2011/2012  Hellenic Championship, with Olympiacos Piraeus
 2012/2013  Hellenic Championship, with Olympiacos Piraeus
 2013/2014  Hellenic Championship, with Olympiacos Piraeus
 2014/2015  Hellenic Championship, with Olympiacos Piraeus
 2015/2016  Hellenic Championship, with Olympiacos Piraeus
 2016/2017  Hellenic Championship, with Olympiacos Piraeus
 2017/2018  Hellenic Championship, with Olympiacos Piraeus
 2018/2019  Hellenic Championship, with Olympiacos Piraeus
 2019/2020  Hellenic Championship, with Olympiacos Piraeus

National trophies
 2011/2012  Hellenic Cup, with Olympiacos Piraeus
 2012/2013  Hellenic Cup, with Olympiacos Piraeus
 2013/2014  Hellenic Cup, with Olympiacos Piraeus
 2014/2015  Hellenic Cup, with Olympiacos Piraeus
 2015/2016  Hellenic Cup, with Olympiacos Piraeus
 2016/2017  Hellenic Cup, with Olympiacos Piraeus
 2017/2018  Hellenic Cup, with Olympiacos Piraeus
 2018/2019  Hellenic Cup, with Olympiacos Piraeus

Individuals
 2014 Hellenic Cup Final four: MVP
 2015 European League: Best setter
 2016-17 Hellenic Championship: MVP
 2018 CEV Women's Challenge Cup: MVP
 2019 Hellenic Cup Final four: MVP
 2018-19 Hellenic Championship: MVP

References

External links
 Profile - clubs - titles at women.volleybox.net
 Profile at greekvolley.gr 
 Profile at CEV web site at cev.eu
 Olympiacos Women's Volleyball team at Olympiacos official web site (www.olympiacossfp.gr)

1991 births
Living people
Olympiacos Women's Volleyball players
Greek women's volleyball players
Volleyball players from Athens
Mediterranean Games silver medalists for Greece
Mediterranean Games medalists in volleyball
Competitors at the 2018 Mediterranean Games
21st-century Greek women